Jadunath Kisku (1 July 1923 – 1985) was an Indian politician and a member of the Communist Party of India (Marxist) political party. He was elected to the Lok Sabha, lower house of the Parliament of India in 1977 from Jhargram constituency in West Bengal.

References

External links
Official biographical sketch in Parliament of India website

1923 births
1985 deaths
India MPs 1977–1979
Lok Sabha members from West Bengal
People from Midnapore